The G & J Trophy Race was an automobile race held at the Indianapolis Motor Speedway in each of the two years prior to the first Indianapolis 500.  The trophy was sponsored by the G & J Tire Company.

Race results

Note:

[a] Billy Pearce was awarded the victory in the G & J Trophy race of July 1, 1910, after the original first and second place finishers (Bob Burman and Louis Chevrolet) were disqualified. The disqualifications took place a few weeks after the race was run, because Burman's and Chevrolet's Marquette-Buick cars did not meet the rules' definition of a "stock car." Burman's winning time would have been 0:40:03.08, for a speed of 74.904 mph.

Sources

Scott, D. Bruce; INDY: Racing Before the 500; Indiana Reflections; 2005; .
Galpin, Darren;  A Record of Motorsport Racing Before World War I.
http://www.motorsport.com/stats/champ/byyear.asp?Y=1909
http://www.motorsport.com/stats/champ/byyear.asp?Y=1910
http://www.champcarstats.com/year/1909.htm
http://www.champcarstats.com/year/1910.htm

Auto races in the United States
Motorsport in Indianapolis